Josh Harrington (born August 21, 1983) is an American BMX rider, from Greenville, North Carolina.

Contest history

X-Games Street '11 - 8th
Vegas Dew Tour Park '11 - 10th
Simpel Session '11 - 7th
Kingston Metro Jam '08 - 5th
Cleveland Dew Tour '07 Park - 4th
Simpel Session '07 - 1st
Simpel Session High Air '07 - 1st
Toronto Metro Jam '06 - 1st
Toronto Metro Best Trick '06 - 1st
LG Action Sports World Championships Park '06 - 6th
Louisville Dew Tour Park '06 - 5th
Denver Dew Tour Vert '06 - 8th
Vancouver Metro Best Trick - 1st
Orlando Dew Tour Park '05 - 6th
X-Games Park '05 - 6th
Toronto Metro Jam '05  - 1st
Vancouver Metro Jam '05 - 1st
Gravity Games Street '05 - 2nd
Gravity Games '05 - 1st
Portland Dew Tour Park '05 - 7th
Mobile Skatepark Series '03 - 1st
Roots Jam Park '03 : 4th
UK Urban Games Street '00 - 4th
UK Urban Games Vert '00 - 4th

References

External links
Team Page on Premium Products
Team Page on Vans
Team Page on Oakley
Team Page on Rockstar Energy Drink
Athlete Page on the Dew Action Sports Tour Website

BMX riders
1983 births
Living people